The International Archives of Medicine is an open access medical journal covering all aspects of medicine. It was established in 2008 and published by BioMed Central until the end of 2014. Starting in 2015, the journal is being published by iMed.pub, the official publisher of the Internet Medical Society, and restructured as a megajournal on all areas of medicine. The journal was abstracted and indexed from 2009 until its delisting in 2015 in Scopus.

In 2015, as part of a sting operation, science journalist John Bohannon submitted an intentionally flawed study that claimed that eating chocolate aided weight-loss to the International Archives of Medicine. The journal editors later said that the article hadn't been accepted and was posted on the journal website only "for some hours", while Bohannon produced previous correspondence from the editors that said otherwise.

The journal's publishers, Internet Medical Publishing (and now iMed.pub), are both listed as potentially predatory publishers on "Beall's list" compiled by librarian Jeffrey Beall.

References

External links 
 
 Journal page at iMed.pub

Open access journals
General medical journals
Publications established in 2008
English-language journals